The Spikers’ Turf Reinforced Conference was the 6th conference of the Spikers' Turf that started on October 1, 2016 and ended on November 12, 2016, games were held at the PhilSports Arena in Pasig. There were six (6) competing teams in this conference.

Preliminary round

|}

 All times are in Philippines Standard Time (UTC+08:00)

|}

Final round
 All series are best-of-3

Semifinals
Rank 1 vs rank 4

|}
Rank 2 vs rank 3

|}

Finals
3rd place

|}
Championship

|}

Awards

Most Valuable Player (Finals)
 Bryan Bagunas (Air Force)
Most Valuable Player (Conference)
 Howard Mojica (Air Force)
Best Setter
  Jessie Lopez (Air Force)
Best  Outside Spikers
 Howard Mojica (Air Force)
 Lorenzo Capate (Cignal)

Best Middle Blockers
 Kheeno Franco (IEM)
 Peter Torres (Cignal)
Best Opposite Spiker
 Berlin Paglinawan (Champion)
Best Libero
 Sandy Montero (Cignal)

Final standing

 Note: 
 (c) - Team Captain(L) - Libero

References